Huacheng is a town of Wuhua County, in northeastern Guangdong province, China. , It has 3 residential communities and 34 villages under its administration.

References

Towns in Guangdong
Wuhua County